UFC Fight Night: Maia vs. Usman (also known as UFC Fight Night 129) was a mixed martial arts event produced by the Ultimate Fighting Championship that was held on May 19, 2018, at Movistar Arena in Santiago, Chile.

Background
The event marked the promotion's first visit to Chile.

A welterweight bout between The Ultimate Fighter: American Top Team vs. Blackzilians welterweight winner Kamaru Usman and Santiago Ponzinibbio was expected to serve as the event headliner. However, Ponzinibbio pulled out on April 21 due to injury. He was replaced by former UFC Welterweight
and Middleweight Championship challenger Demian Maia.

A flyweight bout between former UFC Flyweight Championship challenger Ray Borg and Brandon Moreno was originally expected to take place at UFC Fight Night: Cowboy vs. Medeiros. However, due to a minor injury sustained by Moreno, the pairing was postponed and rescheduled to take place at UFC 223. The bout was delayed again, after Borg had issues related to glass shards in his eye as a result of the former UFC Featherweight
and Lightweight Champion Conor McGregor and crew bus melee. The pairing was scheduled again and was expected to take place at this event. However, Borg withdrew from the bout to take care of his child, who required brain surgery. He was replaced by Alexandre Pantoja. 

A light heavyweight bout between former UFC Light Heavyweight Champion Maurício Rua and former title challenger Volkan Oezdemir was expected to take place at this event. However, it was reported on April 13, 2018, that Oezdemir was pulled from the event due to alleged visa issues stemming from a previous legal transgression, restricting his travel to Chile. The pairing was left intact and rescheduled for July 22, 2018, at UFC Fight Night: Volkan vs. Shogun.

Results

Bonus awards
The following fighters were awarded $50,000 bonuses:
Fight of the Night: Andrea Lee vs. Veronica Macedo
Performance of the Night: Gabriel Benítez and Claudio Puelles

See also
List of UFC events
List of current UFC fighters
2018 in UFC

References

UFC Fight Night
2018 in mixed martial arts
2018 in Chilean sport
Mixed martial arts in Chile
Sports competitions in Santiago
Sport in Santiago